Peyronie's disease is a connective tissue disorder involving the growth of fibrous plaques in the soft tissue of the penis. Specifically, scar tissue forms in the tunica albuginea, the thick sheath of tissue surrounding the corpora cavernosa, causing pain, abnormal curvature, erectile dysfunction, indentation, loss of girth and shortening.

It is estimated to affect 1–20% of men. The condition becomes more common with age.

Signs and symptoms

A certain degree of curvature of the penis is considered normal, as many people are born with this benign condition, commonly referred to as congenital curvature. The disease may cause pain; hardened, big, cord-like lesions (scar tissue known as "plaques"); or abnormal curvature of the penis when erect due to chronic inflammation of the tunica albuginea (CITA).

Although the popular conception of Peyronie's disease is that it always involves curvature of the penis, the scar tissue sometimes causes divots or indentations rather than curvature. The condition may also make sexual intercourse painful and/or difficult, though it is unclear whether some men report satisfactory or unsatisfactory intercourse in spite of the disorder. The disorder is confined to the penis, although a substantial number of men with Peyronie's exhibit concurrent connective tissue disorders in the hand, and to a lesser degree, in the feet. About 30 percent of men with Peyronie's disease develop fibrosis in other elastic tissues of the body, such as on the hand or foot, including Dupuytren's contracture of the hand. An increased incidence in genetically related males suggests a genetic component. It can affect men of any race and age.

Psychosocial
Peyronie's disease can also have psychological effects. While most men will continue to be able to have sexual relations, they are likely to experience some degree of erectile dysfunction. It is not uncommon to exhibit depression or withdrawal from their sexual partners.

Causes
The underlying cause of Peyronie's disease is unknown. Although, it is likely due to a buildup of plaque inside the penis due to repeated mild sexual trauma or injury during sexual intercourse or physical activity.

Risk factors include diabetes mellitus, Dupuytren's contracture, plantar fibromatosis, penile trauma, smoking, excessive alcohol consumption, genetic predisposition, and European heritage.

Diagnosis

A urologist may be able to diagnose the disease and suggest treatment. An ultrasound can provide conclusive evidence of Peyronie's disease, ruling out congenital curvature or other disorders.

Ultrasonography
On penile ultrasonography, the typical appearance is hyperechoic focal thickening of the tunica albuginea. Due to associated calcifications, the imaging of patients with Peyronie's disease shows acoustic shadowing, as illustrated in figures below. Less common findings, attributed to earlier stages of the disease (still mild fibrosis), are hypoechoic lesions with focal thickening of the paracavernous tissues, echoic focal thickening of the tunica without posterior acoustic shadowing, retractile isoechoic lesions with posterior attenuation of the beam, and focal loss of the continuity of the tunica albuginea. In the Doppler study, increased flow around the plaques can suggest inflammatory activity and the absence of flow can suggest disease stability. Ultrasound is useful for the identification of lesions and to determine their relationship with the neurovascular bundle. Individuals with Peyronie's disease can present with erectile dysfunction, often related to venous leakage, due to insufficient drainage at the site of the plaque. Although plaques are more common on the dorsum of the penis, they can also be seen on the ventral face, lateral face, or septum.

Treatment

Medication and supplements
Many oral treatments have been studied but results so far have been mixed. Some consider the use of nonsurgical approaches to be controversial.

Vitamin E supplementation has been studied for decades, and some success has been reported in older trials; those successes have not been reliably repeated in larger, newer studies. The use of Interferon-alpha-2b in the early stages of the disease has been studied; as of 2007, its efficacy was questionable.

Collagenase clostridium histolyticum is reported to help by breaking down the excess collagen in the penis. It was approved for treatment of Peyronie's disease by the FDA in 2013.

Physical therapy and devices
There is moderate evidence that penile traction therapy is a well-tolerated, minimally invasive treatment; there is uncertainty about the optimal duration of stretching per day and per course of treatment, and the treatment course is difficult.

Focused shockwave therapy
Focused extracorporeal shockwave therapy is a non-invasive treatment option that involves passing acoustic pulses through the plaque, which can break it down over a series of six to twelve sessions. The treatment is most effective in men with mild to moderate Peyronie's.

Surgery
Surgery such as the "Nesbit operation", which is named after Reed M. Nesbit (1898–1979), an American urologist at University of Michigan), is considered a last resort and should only be performed by highly skilled urological surgeons knowledgeable in specialized corrective surgical techniques. A penile implant may be appropriate in advanced cases.

Epidemiology 
It is estimated to affect 1–20% of men. The condition becomes more common with age. The mean age at onset of disease is 55–60 years although many cases have been recorded in adolescence and early 20’s.

The overall prevalence of PD is about 1–20% in men. Rates range from 3.2 percent in a community-based survey of 4432 men (mean age of sample 57.4) to 16 percent among 488 men undergoing evaluation for erectile dysfunction (mean age 52.8). The prevalence of PD among the 4432 men in the community based study who responded by self report positively for palpable plaque, newly occurring angulation or curvature and painful erection was 1.5 percent between the ages of 30 and 39, 3 percent between 40 and 49, 3 percent between 50 and 59, 4 percent between 60 and 69, and 6.5 percent over 70.

In 534 men undergoing routine prostate screening for cancer detection (without a specific urologic complaint), the prevalence of PD was 8.9 percent. In this study, the mean age of those with PD was 68.2 years compared with 61.8 years of those without PD.

History
The condition was first described in 1561 in correspondence between Andreas Vesalius and Gabriele Falloppio and separately by Gabriele Falloppio. The condition is named for François Gigot de la Peyronie, who described it in 1743.

References

External links 

 Medscape Urology overview of Peyronie's disease

Dermal and subcutaneous growths
Penis disorders
Sexual health
Diseases named for discoverer